Golshanabad (also Romanized as Golshanābād) is a village in Shamsabad Rural District, in the Central District of Arak County, Markazi Province, Iran. At the 2006 census, its population was 192, in 46 families.

References 

Populated places in Arak County